The Pfeifer & Langen industrial and trade KG , based in Cologne, is an in-family-owned food company. The historical core of the group is the sugar manufacturer Pfeifer & Langen. The other activities of the group are held by the subgroups Intersnack, a manufacturer of snack and nibble products which is the owner of a British Snack company KP Snacks, Tayto (Republic of Ireland) and the subgroup Naturkost Group, created in 2019, with business activities in the production and sale of functional food raw materials, functional proteins and functional carbohydrates. In addition, the group holds a 50% share in the food manufacturer Krüger (including instant coffee, tea, cocoa and chocolate). The entire group achieved a turnover of 3.63 billion euros in the 2019 financial year.

References 

German cuisine
British snack foods
Manufacturing companies of Germany